Ellerbe Creek is tributary of the Neuse River in North Carolina, USA. It is part of the Neuse River Basin, and flows for more than twenty miles through North Durham.  The Ellerbe's watershed begins near Orange County north of Interstate 85, near the WDNC radio tower and Bennett Place. The creek flows through many of Durham's most historic and culturally significant areas, including Ninth Street, Downtown Durham, beneath Durham Athletic Park, The North Carolina School of Science and Mathematics, the Museum of Life and Science, the old Durham Landfill, Duke University East Campus, Trinity Park, Walltown, Northgate Mall, and towards the end crosses Fishdam Road. The Ellerbe eventually flows into Falls Lake, about a mile south of the Eno River.

It has been cited as the most polluted creek in The Triangle region of North Carolina. A watershed improvement plan was prepared by the Brown and Caldweld firm for the City of Durham in 2010.

Some say Ellerbe is a name derived from a Native American language, while others believe the creek is named after  John Ellerby, an early settler.

See also 

 List of North Carolina rivers
 Dye Branch
 Eno River
 Ellerbe Creek Trail

External links 
 Ellerbe Creek Watershed Association
 The Friends of South Ellerbe Creek

References

Rivers of Durham County, North Carolina
Rivers of North Carolina
Research Triangle
Tributaries of Pamlico Sound